Eugenio Caetano do Amaral (March 1896 – 20 December 1970) was a Brazilian sports shooter. He competed in the 25 m rapid fire pistol event at the 1932 Summer Olympics.

References

External links
 

1896 births
1970 deaths
Brazilian male sport shooters
Olympic shooters of Brazil
Shooters at the 1932 Summer Olympics
Sportspeople from Curitiba